Mahishi is a village situated in the Saharsa district of northern Bihar. It is 16 kilometers west of the Saharsa district headquarters and 8 kilometers west of Bangaon, Bihar. It is place of utmost religious importance due to Shaktipeeth of Goddess Ugratara. People of the village speak Maithili. The western Kosi embankment is only a few hundred meters away.

See also 
List of villages of Saharsa

References 

Villages in Saharsa district
Populated places in Mithila, India